A ledger is an accounting book for recording accounting transactions.

Ledger may also refer to:

Publications
 The Ledger, a Florida newspaper
 Ledger (journal), a peer-reviewed journal on cryptocurrency
 Antioch Daily Ledger, a California newspaper
 Jewish Ledger, a Connecticut newspaper
 Ledger-Enquirer, an Ohio newspaper
 Monadnock Ledger, a New Hampshire newspaper
 Monadnock Ledger-Transcript, a New Hampshire newspaper
 The Patriot Ledger, a Massachusetts newspaper
 Public Ledger (Philadelphia), a Pennsylvania newspaper
 The Star-Ledger, a New Jersey newspaper
 New York Ledger, a fictional tabloid in the Law & Order franchise

Technology
 Distributed ledger
 Ledger (software)
 SQL-Ledger

Art
 The Ledger Awards, in Australian comic art and publishing
 Ledger line, a tool of musical notation
 Ledger, a solo project for Skillet drummer Jen Ledger

Other uses
 General ledger
 Ledger (surname)
 Ledger stone, a flat stone slab covering a grave
 In construction a ledger is a horizontal support such as in scaffolding
 Ledger, a paper size

See also
 Leger (disambiguation)